Christopher DeLaurenti (born 1977) is a Seattle-based composer, improvisor and phonographer. A new music rabble-rouser, he also writes music reviews and articles. His electro-acoustic works are composed of field recordings and often deal with political issues, political protests in particular. His weekly column, The Score, appeared in the Seattle alt-weekly The Stranger from 2002 to 2010. His writings have also appeared in 21st Century Music, The Seattle Times, Signal to Noise, Soundscape, Earshot Jazz, and Tablet.

DeLaurenti is currently a visiting assistant professor at the College of William & Mary in Williamsburg, Virginia.

References

Further reading
DeLaurenti, Christopher. "The flap-o-phone, a Site-Specific Turntable." eContact! 14.3 — Turntablism (January 2013). Montréal: CEC.
DeLaurenti, Christopher. "flap-o-phone Construction and Assembly Instructions." eContact! 14.3 — Turntablism (January 2013). Montréal: CEC.

1977 births
Living people
Cornish College of the Arts faculty
Musicians from Seattle